Vorra is a municipality  in the district of Nürnberger Land in Bavaria in Germany.

Notable inhabitants
 Johann Friedrich Stoy (1700–1760), Evangelical theologian
 Hans Vogel (1881–1945), politician (SPD)

References

Nürnberger Land